The hiragana cities of Japan are municipalities whose names are written in hiragana rather than kanji as is traditional for Japanese place names. Many hiragana city names have kanji equivalents that are either phonetic manyōgana, or whose kanji are now obsolete.  Others, such as Tsukuba in Ibaraki Prefecture, are taken from localities or landmarks whose names continue to be written in kanji.

List of fully Hiragana cities and towns

List of partially Hiragana cities

List of Katakana cities

Populated places in Japan
Japanese writing system